Kolletikota is a village in Eluru district of the Indian state of Andhra Pradesh. It is located in Kaikaluru mandal of Gudivada revenue division.

Culture 
Peddintlamma Temple is the temple in the village.

See also 
Villages in Kaikaluru mandal

References

External links

Villages in Krishna district